Die Happy was an American Christian rock band. The group was formed in 1990 when Vengeance Rising members Larry Farkas, Doug Thieme, Glen Mancaruso, and Roger Dale Martin split the band, citing unrest with that band's front man and vocalist, Roger Martinez. They hired Robyn Kyle Basauri, formerly of Jaguar, as a vocalist and he officially joined the band after the release of their eponymous debut.

At the time of their first album the band was seen as "Vengeance Rising with a new Vocalist". For their second release, however, their sound changed to more of a hard, classic rock sound. Lyrically, the band was socially focused. Songs dealt with issues such as Magic Johnson and HIV-AIDS ("Real") and American Indian massacres ("Painted Truth").

Related Projects
Following the demise of Die Happy, Robyn Kyle Basauri and bassist Greg Chaisson formed the band Red Sea. Hiring Chris Howell on guitar and Jeff Martin on drums, the band released one album, Blood, on Rugged Records in 1994. They were initially scheduled for a support tour with Ken Tamplin, but were dropped in favor of Greg X. Volz. Musically, they were compared to the English band Deep Purple.

Larry Farkas, Glen Mancaruso, Roger Dale Martin, and Doug Thieme had reformed under the new name Once Dead with the addition of Ultimatum vocalist Scott Waters. Originally planning to be a reunion, Martinez owned the original rights to the name. Instead of fighting for the rights to "Vengeance Rising," they instead used the name "Once Dead". Once Dead has released one album so far, Visions of Hell. The line up for this release included Jim Chaffin (The Crucified, The Blamed, Facedown, Deliverance) on drums and Devin Schaeffer (Fasedown) on vocals. A follow up album has been delayed due to a vocal condition of Schaeffer's.

Discography
1992: Die Happy (Intense Records, Review: Cross Rhythms)
1993: Volume 2 (Intense Records)
1993: Intense Live Series Vol. 4 (Intense Records)

Members 

Current
 Robyn Kyle Basauri – vocals (1990–1994)
 Larry Farkas – guitars (1990–1994)
 Doug Thieme – guitars (1990–1994)
 Glen Mancaruso – drums (1990–1994)
 Greg Chaisson – bass (1993–1994)

Former
 Roger Dale Martin – bass (1990–1993), lead guitar (1993) [live]

Live musicians
 Andy Robbins – bass (1993)

References

External links
Profile at BNR Metal
Profile at No Life Til Metal
Robyn Kyle Basauri at Shoutlife

American Christian metal musical groups
Christian rock groups from California
Musical groups established in 1990